Coe Township may refer to the following places in the United States:

 Coe Township, Rock Island County, Illinois
 Coe Township, Michigan

Township name disambiguation pages